George L. Shoup is a marble sculpture of George L. Shoup created by Frederick Triebel and placed in the National Statuary Hall Collection in the Capitol Building in Washington, D.C., one of the two statues there from Idaho.  It was dedicated in 1910.  The work cost $7,500 and was unveiled in Washington on January 15, 1910.

See also
 1910 in art

References

External links
 

1910 establishments in Washington, D.C.
1910 sculptures
Bronze sculptures in Washington, D.C.
Monuments and memorials in Washington, D.C.
Shoup, George L.
Sculptures of men in Washington, D.C.
Sculptures in Idaho